A. Venkatachalam (15 September 1955 – 7 October 2010) was a MLA from Alangudi, Tamil Nadu; he represented the constituency for five year terms starting in 1984, 1996 and 2001. During this time, he was also the Minister for Tourism in Chief Minister J. Jayalalitha's cabinet. Venkatachalam was from the village of Vadakadu, which is located in what was his constituency.

Venkatachalam died on 7 October 2010, reportedly murdered by sickle in his house by four people. Angry mobs blocked roads and damaged vehicles in protest.

References

All India Anna Dravida Munnetra Kazhagam politicians
1955 births
2010 deaths
Tamil Nadu MLAs 1996–2001
Tamil Nadu MLAs 2001–2006
Tamil Nadu MLAs 1985–1989